Sheershak Anand is an Indian Producer & Director by profession with over fifteen years of experience in electronic media and films. He is known for various Bollywood movies- Aa Dekhen Zara (2009) and Table No. 21 (2013), 3G - A Killer Connection (2013), Guddu Ki Gun (2015)

Early life
Sheershak Anand completed his schooling from Kendriya Vidyalaya Fort William in Calcutta, and graduated from Delhi University armed with a Mathematics degree.

Career
He has worked with well known Eros International as creative consultant. As a writer he’s quite versatile and has done varied forms of writing which includes penning screenplays for feature films, writing for TV shows, web series, radio spots, animation series, educational videos, copy lines, songs etc.
Both Shantanu & Sheershak ventured into feature film making in 2009 and the duo have been writing and directing feature films since then.

Filmography

References

External links

About Sheershak Anand
Twitter
Anand Media Holdings

Living people
21st-century Indian film directors
Hindi-language film directors
Year of birth missing (living people)